Gleichenia is a genus of ferns. Its closest relative is the genus Stromatopteris, restricted to New Caledonia.

Description 
These ferns have creeping rhizomes. The compound eaves fork multiple times, with the final leaf lobes ending in a pinnate arrangement. The sori are found at the bottom of the leaves and are made of a few sporangia. They are not covered by an indusium (protective covering). The sori occur in a unique chamber in the laminar pits - a feature found only in this genus.

Fossil record 

The fossil record indicates that this genus had emerged by the late Jurassic period, although it was far more common in the early Cretaceous period. There is some evidence that it may have emerged even earlier - in the upper Triassic period. There are, however, multiple genera in the fossil record that show a similar leaf branching pattern to Gleichenia, which can make it difficult to determine the exact identity of a specimen that does not have adequately preserved fruiting bodies.

Fossils have been found in across a wide geograhic range including:
 The Pariwar formation in India (Jurassic-Cretaceous boundary)
 Gardeshwar in India (early Cretaceous)
 The Silty Beds of Bedfordshire in England (early Albian age, early Cretaceous).
 The USA (Cretaceous)
 New South Wales, Australia (Miocene epoch, Neogene period)

Species 
The following species are recognised as of February 2023:

Phylogeny of Gleichenia

Unassigned species:
 Gleichenia alstonii Holttum
 Gleichenia elongata Baker
 Gleichenia matthewii Holttum
 Gleichenia paleacea (Copel.) Holttum
 Gleichenia peltophora Copel.
 Gleichenia ×punctulata Colenso
 Gleichenia vulcanica Blume

References

External links
Smith's original description of the genus online at Project Gutenberg

 
Fern genera